The 1983–84 WHL season was the 18th season for the Western Hockey League. Fourteen teams completed a 72-game season. The Kamloops Junior Oilers won the President's Cup.

League notes
 The Nanaimo Islanders relocated to New Westminster, British Columbia, to become the second incarnation of the New Westminster Bruins.

Regular season

Final standings

Scoring leaders
Note: GP = Games played; G = Goals; A = Assists; Pts = Points; PIM = Penalties in minutes

1984 WHL Playoffs

Qualification playoff
 Calgary defeated Saskatoon 8–7 in overtime to claim the sixth-place tiebreaker.

First round
 Regina defeated Calgary 4 games to 0
 Medicine Hat defeated Prince Albert 4 games to 1
 Brandon defeated Lethbridge 4 games to 1

East division round-robin
 Medicine Hat (4–0) advanced directly to the division final.
 Regina (2–2) and Brandon (0–4) played in the division semifinal

Division semi-finals
 Medicine Hat earned a bye
 Regina defeated Brandon 2 games to 1
 Kamloops defeated Seattle 5 games to 0
 Portland defeated New Westminster 5 games to 4

Division finals
 Regina defeated Medicine Hat 4 games to 1
 Kamloops defeated Portland 5 games to 0

WHL Championship
 Kamloops defeated Regina 4 games to 3

All-Star game

There was no All-Star Game in 1983–84.

WHL awards

All-Star Teams

See also
 1984 Memorial Cup
 1984 NHL Entry Draft
 1983 in sports
 1984 in sports

Notes

References
 whl.ca
 2005–06 WHL Guide

Western Hockey League seasons
WHL
WHL